Robert Richardson Bowie (August 24, 1909 – November 2, 2013) was an American diplomat and scholar.

Bowie graduated from Princeton University in 1931 and received a law degree from Harvard University in 1934 and turned down offers to work as a corporate lawyer with New York's major law firms, returning to Baltimore to work in his father's law firm, Bowie and Burke.  He served in the U.S. Army (1942–1946) as a commissioned officer with the Pentagon and in occupied Germany from 1945 until 1946. In 1946 he resigned as a lieutenant-colonel. He taught at Harvard from 1946-1955.  The youngest professor of the school, he was a trusted confidant to John J. McCloy, the "unofficial chairman of the American establishment." During periods of leave from Harvard between 1950 and 1952 Bowie worked for McCloy as one of his legal advisers in West Germany.

He served as Director of Policy Planning from 1953–1957; co-founder, with Henry Kissinger, of Harvard's Center for International Affairs (1958); Counselor for the State Department from 1966-1968.  He was a member of the Council on Foreign Relations, the Trilateral Commission, the American Law Institute, and the American Academy of Diplomacy. He is a recipient of the Legion of Merit and the Commander's Cross of the Order of Merit of the Federal Republic of Germany.

He served as CIA chief National Intelligence Officer from 1977-1979.

He died at the age of 104 in November 2013.

Books
 Waging Peace: How Eisenhower Shaped an Enduring Cold War Strategy, by Robert R. Bowie and Richard H. Immerman, Oxford UP, 1998, . Endnotes
 Suez, 1956,  Oxford UP
 Shaping the Future: Foreign Policy in an Age of Transition, Columbia UP

References

External links
 Bio from the Eisenhower Memorial Commission
 Harvard Weatherhead Center for International Affairs 
 100th Birthday Celebration

1909 births
2013 deaths
Princeton University alumni
International relations scholars
People of the Central Intelligence Agency
Recipients of the Legion of Merit
American centenarians
Commanders Crosses of the Order of Merit of the Federal Republic of Germany
Directors of Policy Planning
Harvard Law School alumni
Harvard University faculty
Men centenarians
People from Baltimore
Bowie family